Percussion may refer to:
 Percussion instrument, a large group of musical instruments
 Percussion idiophone, a percussion instrument which is beaten with a hand or with a dissimilar, non-sounding beater, as opposed to a concussion idiophone which is beaten against a second similar instrument
 In the Hornbostel–Sachs classification system, percussion refers generally to any object that beats against a dissimilar, non-sounding object, so a clarinet reed is described as percussion while an oboe reed is concussion
 Percussion (medicine), a method of clinical examination
 Percussion cap, an ignition system in firearms
 Percussive foraging, a method of finding food used by the Aye-aye lemur

See also 
 Repercussion (disambiguation)